The Swedish Market Court is a Swedish government agency that answers to the Ministry of Integration and Gender Equality. It is located in Stockholm.

The Market Court is a specialized court that tries cases related to the Swedish Competition Act as well as cases involving the Swedish  Marketing Act and other consumer and marketing legislation.

See also
Government agencies in Sweden.

References

External links
 

Courts in Sweden
Market Court